The Protection of Natural Amenities Medal was an Estonian award conferred to the trustees of Protection of Natural Amenities and other persons who are distinguished in the work of nature protection. Statutes of this award were granted by the President of the Republic, 27 February 1940.

This Medal was granted in three ranks by the Council of Protection of Natural Amenities. This is a rhombus-shaped badge (in gold, silver or bronze, respectively to the rank) with green enamel, representing small State Arms with rays and letters LK (Looduskaitse), bordered by the gable of an Estonian farmhouse above, and a pine-cone with needles below. Medal exists in full size, worn in right breast, or in miniature, worn in left buttonhole.
 
Granting of this Medal was intended May 1 of every year but because of beginning of Soviet occupation this was granted only once, May 1, 1940. This was handed over in towns by the Mayors and in the country by the Chairmen of rural councils. In the County of Harju and in Tallinn the Director of the Institute of Protection of Natural Amenities and Tourism presented this medal. Additionally on June 20, 1940 two more medals were granted, but not handed over to recipients.

Recipients of  the Protection of Natural Amenities Medal

I Rank
Konstantin Päts, President of the Republic

II Rank
Heinrich Koppel, former Rector of the University of Tartu
Oskar Kask, Minister of the Social Affairs
, Director of the Institute of Protection of Natural Amenities and Tourism
Teodor Lippmaa, Professor of Tartu University
Andres Mathiesen, Professor of Tartu University
Gustav Vilbaste, Inspector of Protection of Natural Amenities

Aleksander Tõnisson, Lord Mayor of Tallinn (granted on June 20, 1940)

III Rank
Hans Alver, Mayor of Haapsalu
Artur Toom
Teodor Saar
Eduard Kildemaa
Eduard Keeleste
Olga Kalm
Joosep Eplik
Mihkel Sild
Lui Jõgi

Artur Vainola (:et) 
Aleksander Suur (:et) 
Johannes Maide (:et)
August Blaubrück
Georg Janno
Albert Soovere (granted on June 20, 1940)

See also
Estonian State Decorations

References

Further reading
Esimene Eesti looduskaitse seadus, koostanud Andres Tõnisson, Tallinn 2006. , 

Orders, decorations, and medals of Estonia